Katherine Orrison (born November 18, 1948) is an American set decorator, art director, producer, costumer, author and film historian specializing in the films of Cecil B. DeMille, the life and career of actor Henry Wilcoxon, and the epic film The Ten Commandments.

Early life and education 
Orrison was born in Anniston, Alabama to John M. Orrison and Mary H. Orrison. She spent time visiting her grandparents in Pompano Beach, Florida when she was young. She was inspired to pursue film after seeing The Ten Commandments film when she was 9 years old. She even started putting lamb's blood on her doorposts after seeing the film.

Orrison graduated from the Sacred Heart Convent in Cullman, Alabama in 1966. She later attended the Pasadena Playhouse College of Theater Arts (in Pasadena, California). She married Peter Coe, but their marriage was annulled in 1969. After the annulment, Orrison worked for various companies like Filmation and Disney on animated films and commercials from 1969 to 1980. She then attended the American Film Institute in Beverly Hills, California from 1980 through 1982.

Career
After leaving the American Film Institute, Orrison worked in the Hollywood film industry for over twenty years as an animation checker, associate producer, production manager, art director, set decorator and costumer. Her body of work included Miracle Mile (1988) and The Doors (1991). She also restored and decorated the Mayan Theater in downtown Los Angeles.

Orrison wrote for Cult Movies magazine writing on topics like Lawrence of Arabia, actresses Yvonne De Carlo and Joan Woodbury, the re-modeling of Cecil B. De Mille's home in Los Feliz, and Blade Runner. In addition, she wrote in their book review column. She worked for Cult Movies for over ten years.

Orrison was a film historian in various television documentaries. Orrison is also an author: she wrote a biography of Henry Wilcoxon called Lionheart in Hollywood which she worked on for two and a half years. Another one of her books was titled Written in Stone: Making Cecil B. DeMille's Epic "The Ten Commandments". She has also collaborated on screenplays like Rave-On Macbeth (2002) a European screenplay.

On September 7, 1971, Orrison married Sherman Labby. He is also involved in the film industry as a production illustrator and storyboard artist. He died in 1998 from the effects of muscular dystrophy.

Selected filmography

Bibliography

References

Further reading

External links 
 Katherine Orrison webpage
 
 Interview with Peter Chattaway of the Filmchat blog
Katherine Orrison papers on Written in Stonen, MSS 8178 at L. Tom Perry Special Collections, Brigham Young University

American film historians
American film critics
American set decorators
Living people
1948 births
People from Anniston, Alabama
American art directors
American film producers
American women film producers
American women film critics
American women historians
21st-century American women